The 2011–12 Pachuca season was the 65th professional season of Mexico's top-flight football league. The season is split into two tournaments—the Torneo Apertura and the Torneo Clausura—each with identical formats and each contested by the same eighteen teams. Pachuca began their season on July 23, 2011 against Santos Laguna, Pachuca play their homes games on Saturdays at 7:00pm local time.

Torneo Apertura

Squad

 (Captain) *

 *

 *

Regular season

Apertura 2011 results

Final phase

UANL advanced 4–0 on aggregate

Goalscorers

Results

Results summary

Results by round

Transfers

In

Out

Torneo Clausura

Squad

 (Captain)
 
 

 (Vice-Captain)

Regular season

Clausura 2012 results

Final phase

América advanced 3–2 on aggregate

Goalscorers

Regular season

Source:

Final phase

Results

Results summary

Results by round

References

2011–12 Primera División de México season
Mexican football clubs 2011–12 season